Jiangnan, also romanized as Kiangnan, Chiang-nan, and Jiang Nan, is a geographic area in China referring to lands immediately to the south of the lower reaches of the Yangtze River, including the southern part of its delta. The region encompasses the city of Shanghai, the southern part of Jiangsu Province, the southeastern part of Anhui Province, the northern part of Jiangxi Province and the northern part of Zhejiang Province. The most important cities in the area include Anqing, Changzhou, Hangzhou, Nanjing, Ningbo, Shaoxing, Suzhou, Wuxi, Wenzhou, Yangzhou and Zhenjiang.

Jiangnan has long been regarded as one of the most prosperous regions in China due to its wealth in trade and very high human development. Most people of the region speak Wu Chinese dialects as their native languages.

Name
The name Jiangnan is the atonal pinyin romanization of the Standard Mandarin pronunciation of the Chinese name , meaning "[Lands] South of the [Yangtze] River". (Although  is now the common Chinese word for any large river, it was previously used in Ancient Chinese as the specific name of the Yangtze, with other use spreading from there.) Using other romanization systems, the same Chinese name was also written Chiang-nan, Chiangnan, Kiang-nan, Kiangnan, and Keang-nan in English and other European languages.

History  

The earliest archaeological evidences were of the Majiabang and of the Hemudu cultures. The later Liangzhu culture, from around 2600–2000 BC, created complex and beautiful jade artifacts. Their economy was based on rice cultivation, fishing and constructed houses on stilts over rivers or lakes. During the Zhou dynasty, the Wu and Baiyue peoples inhabited the area with heavy aquaculture and stilt houses, but became increasingly sinicized through contact with northern Chinese states. They adopted the Chinese writing system and created excellent bronze swords. The Chu state from the west (in Hubei) expanded into this area and defeated the Yue state. After Chu was conquered by the Qin state, China was unified. It was not until the fall of the Western Jin dynasty during the early 4th century AD that northern Chinese moved to Jiangnan in significant numbers. The Yellow River valley was becoming barren due to flooding (lack of trees after intensive logging to create farmland) and constant harassment and invasion by the Wu Hu nomads.

Although Chinese civilization originated in the North China Plain around the Yellow River, natural climate change and continuous harassment from nomadic enemies damaged North China's agricultural productivity throughout the 1st millennium AD. Many people settled in South China, where the Jiangnan area's warm and wet climate were ideal for supporting agriculture and allowed highly sophisticated cities to arise. As early as the Eastern Han dynasty (circa 2nd century AD), Jiangnan areas became one of the more economically prominent areas of China. Other than rice, Jiangnan produced highly profitable trade products such as tea, silk, and celadon porcelain (from Shangyu). Convenient transportation – the Grand Canal to the north, the Yangtze River to the west, and seaports such as Yangzhou – contributed greatly to local trade and also trade between ancient China and other nations.

Several Chinese dynasties were based in Jiangnan. After the Qin dynasty fell, the insurgent state of Chu took control. Its ruler, Xiang Yu, was born here. During the Three Kingdoms period, Jianye (present-day Nanjing) was the capital of Eastern Wu. In the 3rd century, many northern Chinese moved here after nomadic groups controlled the north. In the 10th century, Wuyue was a small coastal kingdom founded by Qian Liu who made a lasting cultural impact on Jiangnan and its people to this day. After the Jurchen completely overran northern China in the Jin–Song war of the 1120s, the exiled Song dynasty government retreated south, establishing the new Southern Song capital at Hangzhou in 1127. 

During the last years of the Yuan dynasty, Jiangnan was fought for by two major rebel states: Zhu Yuanzhang's Ming faction, based in Nanjing, and the Suzhou-centered Wu faction led by Zhang Shicheng. A ten-year rivalry ended with Zhu's capture of Suzhou in 1367; having thus reunified Jiangnan, Zhu proclaimed himself the first emperor of the Ming dynasty on Chinese New Year's Day (20 January) of 1368, and a few months later expelled the Mongols from Northern China as well. Nanjing remained the capital of the Ming dynasty until the early 15th century, when the third Ming ruler, the Yongle Emperor, moved the capital to Beijing.

When the Qing dynasty first took over China, they renamed the "Southern Directly-Controlled Area" around the Ming's southern capital Nanjing to be their Jiangnan Province, which was later divided into the separate provinces of Jiangsu and Anhui overseen by the Viceroy of Liangjiang. Besides assisting the Southern Ming as long as possible, Jiangnan's gentry offered initial resistance to the Manchu Qing by interrupting tax collection in the area.

The Qianlong Emperor of the Qing dynasty made many visits to Jiangnan, which have been the popular subject of numerous Chinese operas and television dramas. Earlier, the Kangxi Emperor visited the region as well. Jiangnan, specifically Shaoxing, was actually the southern terminus of Kangxi's so-called Southern Inspection Tour.

During the 19th century Taiping Rebellion, the regime established by the Taiping rebels occupied much of Jiangnan and eventually made Nanjing its capital. The area suffered much damage as the rebellion was quelled and Qing imperial rule restored.

After the fall of the Qing dynasty in 1911, and Chiang Kai-shek's Northern Expedition, the Republic of China (ROC), following the wishes of Sun Yat-sen, made Nanjing the national capital. From the late 1920s until the Second World War, the Jiangnan area was the focus of Chinese economic development. Much of the Kuomintang's ruling elite and the ROC's economic elite hailed from the Jiangnan area.

Geographical identity

Dialect has also been used as a tool for regional identity and politics in the Jiangbei and Jiangnan regions. While the city of Yangzhou was a flourishing and prosperous centre of trade, it was considered part of Jiangnan (south of the river), which was known to be wealthy, even though Yangzhou was north of the Yangtze River. Once Yangzhou's wealth and prosperity began to wane, it was then considered to be part of Jiangbei (literally "north of the river"), the "backwater".  

In Yangzhou, the Yangzhou massacre during the transition from Ming to Qing dynasty has resulted in drastic decline of Wu speaking population in the city and the demographic change eventually made Taihu Wu dialects extinct in Yangzhou, while Jianghuai Mandarin becomes the more prominent dialect since then. This also made Yangzhou no longer perceived as part of Jiang Nan by some of the Wu speaking population. In the Jiangnan region itself, multiple subdialects of Wu fought for the position of the prestige dialect.

Notable cities
Hangzhou – historic capital of Song dynasty.
Huzhou - famous city for silk and fish in Zhejiang province.
Nanjing – historical capital of China for various periods in history.
Nantong – a prefecture-level city in Jiangsu province.
Ningbo – a sub-provincial city in northeast Zhejiang province.
Shanghai – one of the most important financial and economic centres.
Suzhou – famous for its canals and beautiful architecture such as temples and gardens.
Wenzhou – a city in southeastern Zhejiang.
Yangzhou - a city well known for its cultural reference in Chinese literature and historic sites.
Wuxi – near Suzhou, famous for its beautiful sights of the Lake Tai and culture.

Demographics

Economy 

Historically, Jiangnan exported silk and green tea.

See also 
 Apostolic Vicariate of Kiang-nan for the missionary history
 Henan 
 Lingnan
 Physiographic macroregions of China
 Wu Chinese (language group)
 Wu Chinese-speaking people
 Wu (region)
 Wuyue
 Wuyue culture
 Yangtze Delta

References 

 
Regions of China
Yangtze River Delta
Wu (region)